Gaetano Poziello is an Italian football striker. He was born on 28 March 1975, is 180 cm tall  and weighs 73 kg.

2022 2023 Rufrae Presenzano 
1993-1994  Real Marcianise     0 (0)

1994-1995  Barletta            6 (0)

1995-1996  Casertana          23 (4)

1996-1997  Albanova            9 (0)

1997-1998  Narnese            25 (3)

1998-1999  Campobasso         27 (3)

1999-2000  Bojano             19 (7)

2000-2001  Latina             14 (1)

2001-2002  Real Marcianise    28 (20)

2002       Salernitana         8 (0)

2003       Gladiator          13 (8)

2003       Benevento          15 (2)

2004       Isernia             6 (1)

2004-2005  Real Marcianise    32 (22)

2005-2006  Real Marcianise    16 (4)

2006-2007  Real Marcianise    28 (5)

2007-2008  Real Marcianise    26 (4)

2008-2009  Real Marcianise    24 (1)

2009-2010  Real Marcianise    29 (6)

2010-2011  Turris         0 (0)

External links
 

1975 births
Living people
Italian footballers
Association football forwards